Paradyscherus is a genus of beetles in the family Carabidae, containing the following species:

 Paradyscherus blanci Basilewsky, 1971
 Paradyscherus jeanneli Basilewsky, 1973
 Paradyscherus peyrierasi Basilewsky, 1973

References

Scaritinae